Sung Nak-Woon (Hangul: 성낙운, Hanja: 成樂雲, 2 February 1926 – 28 May 1997) was a South Korean football forward who played for the South Korea in the 1954 FIFA World Cup. He also played for Seoul Football Club.

References

External links
FIFA profile

1926 births
South Korean footballers
South Korea international footballers
Association football forwards
1954 FIFA World Cup players
1997 deaths
Asian Games medalists in football
Footballers at the 1954 Asian Games
Footballers at the 1958 Asian Games
1956 AFC Asian Cup players
AFC Asian Cup-winning players
Medalists at the 1954 Asian Games
Asian Games silver medalists for South Korea